The Sanilac Shores Underwater Preserve was established to promote conservation of the submerged historical resources in Lake Huron near Port Sanilac, Michigan. The Michigan Underwater Preserve Council oversees activities relating to all of Michigan's Underwater Preserves.

The preserve is open to scuba divers.

History
Port Sanilac was originally a lumberjack settlement on the shore of Lake Huron named "Bark Shanty Point."  In 1857 the village was renamed to Port Sanilac, as it is in Sanilac County and Sanilac Township, Michigan. Local legend attributes the name to a Wyandotte Indian Chief named Sanilac.  Local landmarks include the Port Sanilac lighthouse (burning kerosene from its opening in 1886 until its electrification in 1924) and a twenty-room Victorian mansion (now a museum) built in 1850 by a horse-and-buggy doctor, Dr. Joseph Loop.  There are numerous shipwrecks located near Port Sanilac.

See also
Michigan Underwater Preserves

References

External links
MV Great Lakes Diver - Dive Charter Operator
Four Fathoms - Dive Charter Operator
Rec Tec - Dive Charter Operator

Lists of coordinates
Marine parks of Michigan
Protected areas of Sanilac County, Michigan